The Royal Society of Tasmania (RST) was formed in 1843. It was the first Royal Society outside the United Kingdom, and its mission is the advancement of knowledge.

The work of the Royal Society of Tasmania includes:

 Promoting Tasmanian historical, scientific and technological knowledge for the benefit of Tasmanians,
 Fostering Tasmanian public engagement and participation in the quest for objective knowledge,
 Recognising excellence in academia and supporting Tasmanian academic excellence, and
 Providing objective advice for policy relating to Tasmanian issues.

The Patron of the Society is Her Excellency, Professor, the Honourable Kate Warner AM, Governor of Tasmania.

History 
The Society was founded on 14 October 1843 at a meeting convened by Sir John Eardley-Wilmot, Lieutenant Governor, as the Botanical and Horticultural Society of Van Diemen’s Land. Its original aim was to ‘develop the physical character of the Island and illustrate its natural history and productions’. Established under its own Act of the Tasmanian Parliament, the Society is permitted it to create its own By-Laws.

In its early years, the Society was responsible for much of the work in founding the Royal Tasmanian Botanical Gardens, and also began building up substantial collections of both art and natural history specimens, all housed in The Royal Society of Tasmania Museum. These collections became the basis of the Tasmanian Museum and Art Gallery in 1885, when the Society gave them to the Government.

The Society also built up a substantial Library. In September 1930 a new library was opened which held more than 20,000 books and pamphlets. The society’s coat of arms, carved in wood by local artist Nellie Payne was presented at this time.

A branch of the Society was formed in Launceston in 1853. It lapsed but was reconstituted in 1921 and has continued since then.

In 1934 the ornithologist Jane Ada Fletcher became the first woman to give a lecture before other members.

The Tasmanian Society of Natural History 
Drawing its inspiration from the illustrious original Royal Society founded in London in 1660, the Royal Society of Tasmania is the oldest royal society outside the United Kingdom, having had a continuing existence since 1843. Earlier bodies include the 1837 formation of the Tasmanian Society of Natural History by Sir John Franklin assisted by Ronald Campbell Gunn.

Queen Victoria became Patron of the Botanical and Horticultural Society of Van Diemen’s Land in 1844 and the name was changed to The Royal Society of Tasmania of Van Diemen’s Land for Horticulture, Botany and the Advancement of Science. Under the current Act of Parliament, passed in 1911, the name was shortened to The Royal Society of Tasmania.

Sesquicentenary 
On the event of the sesquicentenary of the Society in 1993 it produced the volume Walk to the West to publish James Backhouse Walker's diary of a walk in 1887, including William Piguenit's paintings from that journey.

Membership and activities 
In 2017 the Society's membership numbered about 350 from throughout Tasmania and beyond, meeting in Hobart and Launceston. The Society is administered by a Council comprising elected and ex officio members. The membership of the Royal Society of Tasmania is open to all. The priorities of the Society are addressed through lecture programmes, panel discussions, symposia, excursions, publications including the peer reviewed annual journal Papers and Proceedings of the Royal Society of Tasmania, and a library. Eminent scholars are recognised through various awards and bursaries.

The Society is currently based in the Tasmanian Museum and Art Gallery, Hobart. The Society’s library collection is now based within the University of Tasmania Morris Miller Library, Sandy Bay Campus.

The Northern Chapter is based at the Queen Victoria Museum and Art Gallery, Launceston.

Truganini 
Prior to her death Truganini had pleaded to colonial authorities for a respectful burial, and requested that her ashes be scattered in the D'Entrecasteaux Channel. She feared that her body would be dissected and analyzed for scientific purposes as Aboriginal Tasmanian Wiliam Lenne's body had been. Despite her wishes, within two years, her skeleton was exhumed by the Royal Society of Tasmania and later placed on display.

References

Further reading
  (1895) History of the Royal Society of Tasmania, with portraits of the President, Council and Secretary. Hobart : The Society, Ferguson no. 15176.
 Walker, James Backhouse. Early Tasmania : papers read before the Royal Society of Tasmania during the years 1888 to 1899. Hobart : John Vail, Government Printer, 1914.

External links
Official website
Royal Society of Tasmania at Tasmanian Online Communities
Electronic version of the minutes of the first meeting of "The Society", Van Diemens Land 1841

Society of Tasmania, Royal
Scientific societies based in Australia
1844 establishments in Australia
Organisations based in Hobart
Clubs and societies in Tasmania
Learned societies of Australia